Samir Selmanović PhD, PCC (born 1965 in Zagreb, Croatia) is a Leadership and Life Coach from New York City helping people as a companion on their hero to sage journey through leading retreats, online courses, consulting, coaching, and speaking. Samir serves his clients with experience and insight harvested from a long list of individuals and organizations with whom he has worked. Samir’s passion for ideas and practice propelled him through a B.Sc. in Engineering, an M.A. in Psychology, a Master of Divinity, and a Ph.D. in Human Development. Samir is also a graduate of Georgetown University’s Leadership Coaching Program and is an ICF Professional Certified Coach (PCC). He is the founder and CEO of WISDOM WORKROOM. He has been helping his clients be present (mindfulness training), tell a bigger story (narrative coaching), and befriend the unknown (poetry and spirituality).

As a young alternative theater leader in Europe, an engineer and pastor in the United States, and finally as an executive coach in New York City, Samir has helped develop more than 100 leaders, from ambitious entrepreneurs to sagacious CEOs. He takes his clients through a highly personalized and co-creative relationship to places where they never thought they would go.

Samir was born into complexity and natural chaos. Growing up with a Muslim father, a Christian mother, and an atheist school system—with capitalism to the West and communism to the East—he learned at an early age to elicit and escalate the best in others. Samir’s passion for ideas and problem-solving propelled him through a B.Sc. in Engineering, an M.A. in Psychology, a Master of Divinity, and a Ph.D. in Human Development. Samir is also a graduate of Georgetown University’s Leadership Coaching Program and is an ICF Professional Certified Coach (PCC).

Samir serves his clients with experience and insight gleaned from a long list of individuals and organizations whom he has worked with, including Harvard, Princeton, Glasgow-Caledonian, Freddie Mac, the Tropical Health Alliance Foundation, the New York Foundation for the Arts, World Vision, Get Storied, Agile Boston and the Florida Hospital. Samir loves his home country of Croatia, the streets and humans of New York City where he lives with his wife Vesna and daughters Ena and Leta.

Back in 1990s and 2000s, Samir has been a Christian minister who is known particularly for his work in interfaith dialogue. He is the founder of "Faith House Manhattan", an interfaith community of Christians, Muslims, Jews and humanists/atheists. He has served on the Interfaith Relations Commission of the United States National Council of Churches.

When the pastor of Church of the Advent Hope in New York City, he was honored by the group Muslims Against Terrorism for his assistance following the September 11, 2001 attacks, which included holding a Christian-Muslim discussion at the peak of tensions. He has been praised by many other religious leaders such as Karen Armstrong, Parker Palmer, and Brian McLaren.

Currently, he is Co-chair of Vote Common Good campaign.

Biography 
Selmanovic grew up in the former Yugoslavia (Croatia). While his father was Muslim and mother Christian, he was essentially brought up an atheist. He completed compulsory service in the army, becoming a progressive Christian at age 18. He moved to the United States in 1990, where he completed several graduate degrees. He is a progressive Seventh-day Adventist pastor,  and believes no organized religion is perfect, and seeks to affirm other faiths, including humanism. From 2005 to today, Samir has focused on consulting and coaching work in corporate and entrepreneurial context, and has founded Wisdom Workroom. He lives in NYC and works as an Executive Life Coach.

Publications

References

External links 
 Wisdom Workroom official website

1965 births
Living people
21st-century American businesspeople
American Seventh-day Adventists
American Seventh-day Adventist ministers
Converts to Protestantism from atheism or agnosticism
Converts to Adventism
Yugoslav emigrants to the United States
Businesspeople from Zagreb
Croatian people of Bosniak descent
American people of Croatian descent
American people of Bosniak descent